Scottish referendum may refer to any one of several referendums in Scotland:

 1920 Scottish licensing referendum
 1979 Scottish devolution referendum
 1997 Scottish devolution referendum
 2014 Scottish independence referendum
Proposed second Scottish independence referendum